The 2023 LSU Tigers football team will represent Louisiana State University (LSU) in the Western Division of the Southeastern Conference (SEC) during the 2023 NCAA Division I FBS football season. The Tigers are expected to be led by Brian Kelly in his second year as LSU's head coach. 

LSU was ranked sixth in the 2023 college football recruiting class.

LSU's football team plays its home games at Tiger Stadium in Baton Rouge, Louisiana.

Schedule
LSU and the SEC announced the 2023 football schedule on September 20, 2022. The 2023 Tigers' schedule consists of 7 home games, 4 away games and 1 neutral site game for the regular season. LSU will host four SEC conference opponents Arkansas (rivalry), Auburn (rivalry), Florida (rivalry) and Texas A&M (rivalry) at home and will travel to four SEC opponents, Alabama (rivalry), Mississippi State (rivalry), Missouri and Ole Miss to close out the SEC regular season on the road. LSU is not scheduled to play SEC East opponents Georgia, Kentucky, South Carolina, Tennessee and Vanderbilt in the 2023 regular season. The Tigers's bye week comes during week 9 (on October 28, 2023).

LSU out of conference opponents represent the ACC, SWAC, Sun Belt conferences and one FBS independent school. The Tigers will host three of the four non–conference games which are against Army an FBS independent program, Georgia State from the Sunbelt and Grambling State from the SWAC. The Tigers will play in Orlando, Florida against Florida State from the ACC in the Camping World Kickoff the Sunday before Labor Day.

References

LSU
LSU Tigers football seasons
LSU Tigers football